Ireland competed at the 1984 Summer Paralympics in Stoke Mandeville, Great Britain and New York City, United States. 53 competitors from Ireland won 66 medals including 20 gold, 15 silver and 31 bronze and finished 14th in the medal table.

See also 
 Ireland at the Paralympics
 Ireland at the 1984 Summer Olympics

References 

Ireland at the Paralympics
1984 in Irish sport
Nations at the 1984 Summer Paralympics